Ejiya Cruz Laure (born March 20, 1999), better known as Eya Laure, is a Filipina volleyball player. She currently plays for UST Golden Tigresses volleyball team in the UAAP and Chery Tiggo Crossovers in the Philippine Super Liga. She is a member of the Philippines women's national volleyball team.

Personal life
Laure is from a family of athletes. She is the daughter of Eddie Laure, a professional basketball player who earned the titles "The Dominator" and "The Bounty Hunter" in his stint in the PBA, and Jovie Laure. Her older sister, Ennajie Laure, is her teammate in the UST Golden Tigresses and plays as an outside spiker. His younger brother, Echo Laure, is a member of the boys' basketball team of NU. She finished taking BS Tourism at the University of Santo Tomas.

Clubs
  Chery Tiggo Crossovers (2019–present)

Awards

Individuals
  2012 UAAP Season 75 Juniors "Rookie of the Year"
  2013 UAAP Season 76 Juniors "Best Setter"
  2014 UAAP Season 77 Juniors "Best Attacker"
  2015 UAAP Season 78 Juniors "Season's Most Valuable Player"
 2016 Shakey's Girls Volleyball League (NCR) "Most Valuable Player"
 2016 Shakey's Girls Volleyball League (NCR) "Best Opposite Hitter"
 2016 Shakey's Girls Volleyball League (National) "Most Valuable Player"
 2016 Shakey's Girls Volleyball League (National) "1st Best Outside Spiker"
  2016 UAAP Season 79 Juniors "Best Opposite Hitter"
 2017 Shakey's Girls Volleyball League (NCR) "Best Opposite Hitter"
 2017 Shakey's Girls Volleyball League (National) "Most Valuable Player"
  2017 UAAP Season 80 Juniors "Best Opposite Hitter"
   2018 PSL Collegiate Grand Slam "Best Opposite Hitter"
  2019 UAAP Season 81 Seniors "Rookie of the Year"  2019 UAAP Season 81 Seniors "1st Best Outside Hitter"''

High school
 2012 UAAP Season 75 Juniors -  Bronze medal, with UST Junior Tigresses
 2013 UAAP Season 76 Juniors-  Champions,  with UST Junior Tigresses
 2014 UAAP Season 77 Juniors -  Silver medal,  with UST Junior Tigresses
 2015 UAAP Season 78 Juniors -  Silver medal,  with UST Junior Tigresses
 2016 UAAP Season 79 Juniors -  Silver medal,  with UST Junior Tigresses
 2017 UAAP Season 80 Juniors -  Silver medal,  with UST Junior Tigresses

Collegiate
 2018 PSL Collegiate Grand Slam Conference -  Silver medal,  with UST Golden Tigresses
 2019 UAAP Season 81 Seniors -  Silver medal,  with UST Golden Tigresses
 2019 Premier Volleyball League Collegiate Conference -  Silver medal,  with UST Golden Tigresses

National Team
 2017 ASEAN School Games Volleyball -  Bronze medal, with Philippine Youth Team
 2019 ASEAN Grand Prix – First Leg -  Bronze medal,  with Philippine Team
 2019 ASEAN Grand Prix – Second Leg -  Bronze medal,  with Philippine Team

References

1999 births
Living people
Filipino women's volleyball players
University Athletic Association of the Philippines volleyball players
21st-century Filipino women